The following are the events in professional sumo in 1998.

Tournaments
Hatsu basho, Ryogoku Kokugikan, Tokyo, January 11 – January 25
Haru basho, Osaka Prefectural Gymnasium, Osaka, March 8 – March 22
Natsu basho, Tokyo, May 10 – May 24
Nagoya basho, Aichi Prefectural Gymnasium, July 5 – July 19
Aki basho, Tokyo, September 13 – September 27
Kyushu basho, Fukuoka International Center, November 8 – November 22

News

January
At the  Hatsu tournament in Tokyo, Ozeki Musashimaru wins his third top division championship or yusho, his first since November 1996, with a 12–3 record. He finishes one win ahead of sekiwake Tochiazuma who wins the Outstanding Performance Prize. The other sekiwake Musoyama gets the Fighting Spirit Award, and komusubi Kotonishiki receives his seventh Technique Prize. Yokozuna Takanohana loses three in a row from 8–1 and then withdraws. In the juryo division, Kinkaiyama wins the yusho in his first tournament in the division. Announcing their retirements are former maegashira Asahisato and former juryo Daiki, from Hawaii.

February
The elections prove controversial for the Takasago ichimon, with Jinmaku (former yokozuna Kitanofuji) leaving the Association altogether after failing to receive enough support from his fellow directors, and the Takadagawa stable thrown out of the ichimon after its head coach (former ozeki Maenoyama) runs as an independent candidate.

March
In Osaka, ozeki Wakanohana wins his fourth yusho with a 14–1 score. He finishes one win ahead of yokozuna Akebono, who drops his first two bouts but then wins thirteen in a row. Takanohana drops out after five days with a liver disorder. Chiyotaikai wins the Technique prize and Kaio the Outstanding Performance award. The Fighting Spirit prize is shared between Tosanoumi and Aogiyama. The juryo championship is won by veteran Kushimaumi after a playoff with Toki.

May
The first day of a Tokyo tournament fails to sell out for the first time since 1970.
Wakanohana wins his second consecutive championship, and earns promotion to yokozuna, creating the first ever sibling grand champions. He defeats Musashimaru on the final day to finish on 12–3. Runners-up are Takanonami and Kotonishiki on 11–4. Musashimaru, Takanohana, and Akebono all score 10–5. There are six special prize winners: Akinoshima (Technique), Kotonishiki and Oginishiki (Outstanding Performance), Dejima and Wakanosato (Fighting Spirit). Dejima wins 10 bouts after being out for two tournaments. The juryo championship is won by Oikari after a three way playoff.

June
Sumo Canada Basho in Vancouver.

July
In Nagoya, Takanohana returns from illness to win his 19th championship with a 14–1 score. Musashimaru is runner-up, two wins behind. New sekiwake Chiyotaikai wins eleven and the Technique Prize. Kotonowaka also wins eleven and gets the Fighting Spirit Award. Dejima defeats two yokozuna and wins the Outstanding Performance prize. Wakanohana finishes on 10–5 in his debut yokozuna tournament. In the juryo division, two former makuuchi veterans, maegashira Oginohana and komusubi Misugisato, retire after winning only one and three bouts respectively. The championship is won by Akinoshu, his first yusho after 14 years in sumo.

September
Takanohana becomes only the fourth man, after Taiho, Kitanoumi, and Chiyonofuji,  to reach twenty top division championships. He finishes on 13–2, one win ahead of his brother. Kotonowaka wins the Outstanding Performance prize, and Chiyotaikai the Technique Award. Chiyotenzan wins the juryo championship. Former maegashira Yamato from Hawaii, now in makushita, and former komusubi Tomoefuji, who has fallen to sandanme, announce their retirements.

November
Kotonishiki becomes the first wrestler ever to win two championships as a maegashira after winning in Kyushu with a 14–1 score, seven years after his first yusho in September 1991. He finishes two wins ahead of Takanohana and Tosanoumi, and is awarded Technique and Outstanding Performance prizes. Tochiazuma shares the Technique Prize, and Tosanoumi gets the Fighting Spirit award. Wakanohana can score only 9–6, and Akebono sits the tournament out through injury. The juryo yusho goes to former amateur champion Miyabiyama. Kushimaumi retires, having fallen into the makushita division.

Deaths
10 March: Former komusubi Kenko, aged 30, of leukemia.
26 September: Former maegashira Toyonishiki, first Japanese American to reach makuuchi, aged 78.
4 November: Former sekiwake Maedagawa, aged 61.

See also
Glossary of sumo terms
List of past sumo wrestlers
List of years in sumo
List of yokozuna

References

Sumo by year
Sumo